William Jaffray may refer to:
 one of several Jaffray baronets of that name
 William Jaffray (footballer) (1885–1968), Scottish footballer
 William Jaffray (politician) (1832–1896), publisher and politician in Ontario, Canada
 William Stevenson Jaffray, highly decorated military chaplain